Achatinella mustelina is a species of air-breathing land snail, a terrestrial pulmonate gastropod mollusc in the family Achatinellidae. This species is endemic to the Waianae Range of the island of Oahu, Hawaii.

All 13 subspecies of Achatinella mustelina were synonymized with the species by Holland & Hadfield (2007), because they are not monophyletic.

Habitat
.Mountainous forests.

References

External links
 Species Profile. Oahu Tree snail (Achatinella mustelina)

mustelina
Biota of Oahu
Molluscs of Hawaii
Endemic fauna of Hawaii
Critically endangered fauna of the United States
Gastropods described in 1845
Taxonomy articles created by Polbot
ESA endangered species